Charles Mapp (1903 – 3 May 1978) was a British Labour Party politician.

From a working-class background, Mapp won a scholarship to a grammar school. He worked as a railway goods agent, and was elected to Sale Borough Council in 1932 (serving until 1935) and 1945 (retiring the following year). At the 1950 general election he fought Northwich as the Labour candidate; in 1951 he fought Stretford and in 1955 he was the candidate in Oldham East.

He was reselected for Oldham East and won the seat in the 1959 general election, against the national tide because of depression in the local textiles industry. This was the only seat in England which went from Conservative to Labour at that election. Mapp was re-elected at the 1964 and 1966 elections. He retired at the 1970 general election.

Mapp also worked as a juvenile court magistrate.

References

M. Stenton and S. Lees, "Who's Who of British MPs" Vol. IV (Harvester Press, 1981)

External links 
 

1903 births
1978 deaths
Councillors in Greater Manchester
Labour Party (UK) MPs for English constituencies
Transport Salaried Staffs' Association-sponsored MPs
UK MPs 1959–1964
UK MPs 1964–1966
UK MPs 1966–1970
Politics of the Metropolitan Borough of Oldham